Portomarín is a municipality in the Spanish province of Lugo.  It has a population of 2008 (Spanish 2001 Census) and an area of 115 km². It is located on the pilgrimage route known as the French Way of the Camino de Santiago.

The town of Portomarín was constructed and built next to a Roman bridge over the Minho River and rebuilt in the Middle Ages.

New village 

In the 1960s the Miño River was dammed to create the Belesar reservoir, putting the old village of Portomarín under water. The most historic buildings of the town were moved brick by brick and reconstructed in the new town, including its castle-style main church: Church of San Juan of Portomarín.

In the seasons when the dam is at low level, the remains of ancient buildings, the waterfront and the old bridge are still visible.

Parishes
 Bagude (San Bartolomeu)
 Caborrecelle (San Xulián)
 O Castro de Soengas (San Martiño)
 Castromaior (Santa María)
 Cortapezas (Santa María)

Demography 
From: INE Archiv

Municipalities in the Province of Lugo